The Operated Jew is a satirical antisemitic book published by the German physician Oskar Panizza in 1893. Written from a supposedly medical perspective, it exemplified the scientific racism characteristic of the era.

Plot summary
A young Jewish doctor is caused by antisemitic pressures to escape his Jewishness, which he seeks to do by submitting himself to violent and painful ethnic plastic surgery. He has stereotypical Jewish features: black curly hair, oily skin, thick lips, a large hooked nose, an effeminate voice, poor posture, and orthopedic impairments. He arranges to have all of his bones straightened out, his hair dyed blonde, and his larynx altered to change his voice. He is then placed in a bathtub and given a blood transfusion by pure Aryan virgins. Having been seemingly cured of his Jewishness, the doctor marries a blonde German woman. However, just as he is about to deliver a speech at his wedding, his voice takes on a high pitch and all of his previous Jewish features resurface. He eventually becomes a gelatinous puddle on the floor.

Analysis
The book incorporates the elements of racial antisemitism of the era: the expression of desire on the part of the Jew to escape his cultural identity, the lengths to which he will go to transform himself, the pornographic quality of the attempted transformation, and the impossibility of it all. The author sought to illustrate an idea that Jews cannot escape their race, and attempts to do so will result in them becoming subhuman or untermensch. The image of the Jewish man melting into a puddle at his wedding signifies that Jewishness cannot be overcome by attempts at cultural assimilation.

See also
Ethnic plastic surgery
Racial antisemitism
Self-hating Jew
Passing (racial identity)

References

1893 German novels
1893 German-language novels
Antisemitic novels
Antisemitism in Germany
Nose surgery
Passing (sociology)